"Who Dat Boy" is a song by American rapper Tyler, the Creator featuring fellow American rapper ASAP Rocky. It was released on June 30, 2017 alongside, "911 / Mr. Lonely" through Columbia Records, as the lead singles from the Tyler, the Creator's fourth studio album Flower Boy. The song was written by the two artists and produced by Tyler, the Creator.

Background
Tyler, the Creator began a one-week countdown on Twitter and Instagram to promote and release the two dual-singles called "Who Dat Boy" and "911 / Mr. Lonely" on June 30, 2017. The single debuted at 87 on the Billboard Hot 100. The song was originally written for Schoolboy Q, but he turned it down.

Music video
The song's accompanying music video was uploaded on June 29, 2017 on Tyler's official YouTube channel. The music video was directed by Tyler under the pseudonym Wolf Haley. The music video features rapper Action Bronson's face being sewn onto Tyler's, as well as visual allusions to the 2017 film Get Out. It also features a snippet of the song "911/ Mr. Lonely" at the end of the track. The video features rapper A$AP Rocky, who is the doctor performing the operation, and Tucker Tripp, who is Tyler's co-driver.

Track listing

Charts

Certifications

Release history

References

External links
Lyrics of this song at Genius

2017 singles
2017 songs
Tyler, the Creator songs
ASAP Rocky songs
Songs written by ASAP Rocky
Columbia Records singles
Songs written by Tyler, the Creator

Trap music songs